"I Will" is a 1968 song by The Beatles.

I Will may also refer to:

Films 
I Will (film), a 1919 British silent comedy film

Music

Albums
I Will (F.T. Island album), 2015
I Will (Mozella album), 2006
I Will (Zhang Liyin album), 2008

Songs
"I Will" (Dick Glasser song), 1962
"I Will" (Do song), 2007
"I Will" (Jimmy Wayne song), 2008
"I Will" (Namie Amuro song), 2002
"I Will", a single by Miz
"I Will", by Eminem from Music to Be Murdered By
"I Will", by Matchbox Twenty from North
"I Will", by Mitski from Bury Me at Makeout Creek
"I Will", by Paris Bennett from Princess P
"I Will", by Radiohead from Hail to the Thief
"I Will", by White Lion from Return of the Pride
"I Will", from the 2003 film The Room
"I Will", by Rock and Hyde from 1987

Other uses
 "I Will", the nickname for the flag of Cook County, Illinois